Howard S. Billings Regional High School is an English-language public secondary school located in Châteauguay, Quebec, Canada. It was established in 1967 and is part of the New Frontiers School Board.

The school is named after Dr. Howard S. Billings, a Quebec educator who retired as associate deputy minister of education in 1967.

The school is divided into four wings, corresponding to the cardinal points. The east wing houses New Frontiers School Board offices and the International Baccalaureate Programme.

Campus facilities:

 Large campus
 Bright and spacious library
 Computer labs
 Basketball and tennis courts
 Large track & field area
 Three gymnasiums
 Weight-training room
 Full service cafeteria
 Auditorium
 Sound recording studio
 Art room
 Science labs

References

External links
Howard S. Billings Regional High School

English-language schools in Quebec
Educational institutions established in 1967
High schools in Montérégie
Châteauguay